WDI may refer to:

 Walt Disney Imagineering
 Web data integration
 Windows Diagnostic Infrastructure, a  component of Microsoft Windows
 Wood Destroying Insect
 World Development Indicators, a World Bank database
 Workforce Development Institute
 Women's Declaration International